Kivalina Airport  is a state-owned public-use airport located in Kivalina, a city in the Northwest Arctic Borough of the U.S. state of Alaska.

Facilities 
Kivalina Airport has one runway (12/30) with a gravel surface measuring 3,000 x 60 ft. (914 x 18 m).

Airlines and destinations 

Prior to its bankruptcy and cessation of all operations, Ravn Alaska served the airport from multiple locations.

References

External links
 FAA Alaska airport diagram (GIF)

Airports in Northwest Arctic Borough, Alaska
Airports in the Arctic